Viper Club is a 2018 American drama film directed by Maryam Keshavarz and starring Susan Sarandon. The film was produced by YouTube Premium in association with CounterNarrative and MaraKesh Films and held its world premiere at the Toronto International Film Festival on September 10, 2018. The film was released theatrically in the United States on October 26, 2018.

Premise
Viper Club follows "a veteran emergency room nurse secretly struggling to free her grown son, a journalist, from capture by a terrorist group. After running into roadblocks with government agencies, she discovers a clandestine community of journalists and advocates who might be able to help her."

Cast
 Susan Sarandon as Helen
 Matt Bomer as Sam
 Lola Kirke as Amy
 Julian Morris as Andy
 Sheila Vand as Sheila
 Adepero Oduye as Keisha
 Edie Falco as Charlotte
 Paul Eenhoorn as Jim

Production
On March 21, 2018, it was announced that YouTube Red had just finished production on a film, then-titled Vulture Club, directed by Maryam Keshavarz. The film was written by Keshavarz alongside Jonathan Mastro and executive produced by Anna Gerb, Neal Dodson, and J.C. Chandor. Cast members were set to include Susan Sarandon, Edie Falco, Matt Bomer, Julian Morris, Lola Kirke, and Sheila Vand.

Release
The film was distributed by Roadside Attractions and released on October 26, 2018. Following its theatrical run, the film was made available for streaming on YouTube Premium.

On September 10, 2018, the film held its world premiere at the Toronto International Film Festival as a featured selection in the "Special Presentations" series of films. That same day, the official trailer for the film was released.

Controversy
Ahead of the film's release, Diane Foley, the mother of slain journalist James Foley, expressed criticism of the film. Although the production team contacted and spoke to Foley during the production process, she felt the plot of the film was inappropriate and misleading in its retelling of events from her and her late son's lives. In the process of being consulted for the film, Foley shared details about the process of locating and negotiating for the release of her son. Foley thinks that although director Maryam Keshavarz claims to have made a fictional work, she used and unfairly manipulated details of her personal life to produce a dramatic story.

Reception
The film was met with a mixed to negative response from critics upon its premiere. On the review aggregation website Rotten Tomatoes, the film holds  approval rating with an average rating of  based on  reviews. The website's critical consensus reads, "Viper Club benefits from Susan Sarandon's committed lead performance, but a treacly script robs this geopolitical drama of any bite." Metacritic, which uses a weighted average, assigned the series a score of 57 out of 100 based on 13 critics, indicating "mixed or average reviews".

References

External links
 

2018 films
American drama films
YouTube Premium films
YouTube controversies
Films shot in New York City
2010s English-language films
2010s American films